Tetraspanin-32 is a protein that in humans is encoded by the TSPAN32 gene.

Function 

This gene is described as a member of the tetraspanin superfamily whose expression is confined to hematopoietic tissues.

Clinical significance 

This gene is one of several tumor-suppressing subtransferable fragments located in the imprinted gene domain of 11p15.5, an important tumor suppressor gene region. Alterations in this region have been associated with the Beckwith-Wiedemann syndrome, Wilms tumor, rhabdomyosarcoma, adrenocortical carcinoma, and lung, ovarian, and breast cancer. This gene is located among several imprinted genes; however, this gene, as well as the tumor-suppressing subchromosomal transferable fragment 4 (TSSC4), escapes imprinting. This gene may play a role in malignancies and disease that involve this region as well as hematopoietic cell function.

References

Further reading

External links